The Shenyang X-9 Jian Fan ( X-9 - Xianji-9 - glider-9) is a Chinese training glider built by the Shenyang Sailplane Factory at Shenyang.

Design
The Jian Fan glider is a tandem two-seat braced high-wing monoplane made from aluminium alloy and wood. It was allocated the designation X-9 by the People's Liberation Army Air Force.

Specifications

See also

References

Notes

Glider aircraft
Chinese sailplanes